Semnan Province (Ôstâň-e Śemnân) is one of the 31 provinces of Iran. It is in the north of the country, with its center and capital in the city of Semnan. The province of Semnan covers an area of 96,816 square kilometers and stretches along the Alborz mountain range, bordering on Dasht-e Kavir desert in its southern parts.

At the National Census of 2006, the population of the province was 570,835 in 159,791 households. The following census in 2011 counted 631,218 people in 186,114 households. The province was made part of Region 1 following the division of the provinces into 5 regions, solely for coordination and development purposes, on June 22, 2014. By the time of the most recent census of 2016, the population had risen to 702,360 in 215,571 households.

History

Semnan can be divided into sixteen sectors from the old days of Avesta. In the Median and Achaemenid times, it accounted for being one of the largest provinces of the empires, and today it roughly corresponds to the borders of the ancient region of Parthia.

During the Islamic era, Semnan was part of the historical region of Gomess or Komesh, and the Silk Road paved its way from the midst of this region. Needless to say, the province was witness to numerous wars.

The Cultural Historical Heritage Organization of Iran lists 470 sites of historical and cultural heritage such as palaces, forts, castles, caravansarais, ab anbars, and badgirs in Semnan. In addition to these, there are various religious and sacred places as well.

Geography

The province is divided into two parts: a mountainous region and the plains at the foot of the mountains. The former offers scope for recreational activities as well as being a source for minerals, while the latter encompasses some ancient cities of Iran, including one of the capitals of the ancient Parthian Empire. 

The province neighbors Golestan and Mazandaran to the north, North Khorasan to the northeast, Tehran and Qom to the west, Isfahan to the south, South Khorasan to the southeast, and Razavi Khorasan to the east.

Abr forest

This forest lies in the central province of Semnan, near its border with Golestan Province. It is one of the oldest forests in Iran which is a remnant of the third geological age. The Iranian Roads Ministry's decision to build a road through the forest sparked widespread protests last year.

The environmentalists, backed by the country's media, began a wide campaign against the ministry's decision, which finally led the Prosecutor General to order a halt in the construction of the road. However, all these efforts came to naught when it was announced in April 2008 that the government granted permission to the Roads Ministry to construct the road.

Administrative divisions

Cities 
According to the 2016 census, 560,502 people (nearly 80% of the population of Semnan province) live in the following cities: Amiriyeh 3,561, Aradan 6,257, Bastam 8,609, Beyarjomand 2,528, Damghan 59,106, Darjazin 5,997, Dibaj 5,647, Eyvanki 13,518, Garmsar 48,672, Kalateh 4,611, Kalateh Khij 5,651, Kohanabad 1,192, Mehdishahr 24,485, Meyami 4,566, Mojen 5,932, Rudian 3,770, Semnan 185,129, Shahmirzad 11,191, Shahrud 150,129, and Sorkheh 9,951.

Languages

The Semnani languages (known also as Komisenian languages) spoken in the province are a group of Northwestern Iranian languages, (only 68,700 native speakers in 2019) of Iran.  These languages are accorded only "dialect" status in some sources. Most of the Semnani languages are descendants of the extinct Parthian while Semnani proper has been placed among the Caspian languages descended from the extinct Median.

There are six Semnani languages named in the literature, these being Semnani, Biyabunaki, Sangsari, Sorkhei, Aftari and Lasgerdi - of which some may only be dialects, although there has been little published concerning the relationships between them.

Semnani proper (Semnani: سمنی زفون), like other Caspian languages, bears some resemblance to the Old Iranian Median language but was influenced by Parthian in a later process.

See also
Bayazid Bastami
Ashraf Jahangir Semnani
Darius III
Dasht-e Kavir
Fath Ali Shah Qajar
Hassan Rouhani
Hecatompylos or Shahr-e Qumis
Khar Turan National Park
Mahmud Ahmadinejad
Manuchehri Damghani
Parthia
Rig-e Jenn
Sangsar (Mahdishahr)
Seleucids
Semnani language
Yadollah Royaee

References

External links

History of Semnan Province
Information on Semnan National geoscience database of Iran
Semnan Cultural Heritage Organization
 SemnanLine NEWSPORTAL

 
Provinces of Iran